Acleris ferrugana is a species of moth of the family Tortricidae. It is found in China, most of Europe and has also been recorded from North America.

The wingspan is 14–18 mm. It is a very variable species. Some forms are very similar to Acleris notana and the two can only separated by examination of the genitalia. Julius von Kennel provides a full description.

Adults are on wing in July and again in September and October. The second generation overwinters and reappears in spring.

The larvae feed on Quercus species. They feed from within a spinning between the leaves of their host plant.

References

Moths described in 1775
ferrugana
Tortricidae of Europe
Moths of Asia
Moths of North America